RT Carinae, also known as CD-58 3538, is a variable star in the Carina Nebula in the constellation Carina. It has a mean apparent magnitude of +8.55.

RT Carinae is a red supergiant with a spectral type of M2+ Iab and has a temperature of 3,660 K. With a diameter 861 times that of the Sun, it is one of the largest stars known. The luminosity is estimated to be 120,000 times more luminous than the Sun.  It is close to the open cluster Trumpler 15, but is not thought to be a member.  It appears to be surrounded by a dusty nebula, possibly material ejected from the star itself.

It is catalogued as an irregular variable star, but a number of possible pulsation periods have been detected.  Analysis from observations over 40 years give variations with periods of 201 and 448 days, with other studies suggesting periods of 100 and 1,400 days.

References 

Carina (constellation)
Carina Nebula
Slow irregular variables
M-type supergiants
Carinae, RT
303310
Durchmusterung objects
052562